Salaverry is a port town located  southeast of Trujillo city in the La Libertad Region, Peru. The port, rebuilt in the 1960s by an English company, is able to accommodate large cruise ships.

See also

Buenos Aires, Trujillo
Chicama, Peru
Huanchaco
Las Delicias, Trujillo
Moche, Trujillo
Puerto Chicama
Trujillo, Peru
Vista Alegre, Trujillo

References

External links

Salaverry, Trujillo
Map of Salaverry

Port cities and towns in Peru
Beaches of Trujillo, Peru
Localities of Trujillo, Peru